Inner Ring Road Multan is a project of improvement of roads of Multan city. Abbreviated as IRRM, it has an estimated cost is 4 billion rupees. Former prime minister of Pakistan Syed Yousuf Raza Gillani, who belong to Multan gave this project. The federal Government is the major stakeholder.

Inner Ring of Roads is constituted by 

LMQ or Khanewal Road, 
Old Bahawalpur Road
Nusrat Road
Vihari Road

This constitutes almost 20 km roads with many major roundabouts and congested areas. A series of flyovers are constructed to smooth the traffic. 
These flyovers are
 Chowk Kumharanwala Level II Flyover
 Rasheedabad Flyover
 Chungi No 9 Flyover
 Kachehri Chowk Chungi No 7 & 8 Flyover
 Pul Moj Darya Flyover
 Nishtar Chowk Flyover
 Yousuf Raza Gillani Flyover
 Chowk Shah Abbas Flyover

Project also included the widening of the roads, construction of services roads.

See also
 Chowk Kumharanwala Level II Flyover, Multan
 Pul Moj Darya Flyover, Multan
 Nishtar Chowk Flyover, Multan
 Sher Shah Interchange Flyovers, Multan
 List of Flyovers in Multan
 List of flyovers in Pakistan
 List of flyovers in Lahore

References
 Inner Ring Road Multan IRRM
 Ground Breaking of Yousuf Raza Gillani Flyover Multan
 Cost and Length of Flyover
 Inauguration of Yousuf Raza Gillani Flyover on Saturday, 31 December 2011
 Pakistan PM now has a flyover in his name

External links
 Multan City government website 
 Portal of Multan City

Transport in Multan
Roads in Punjab, Pakistan
Buildings and structures in Multan
Lists of roads in Pakistan